Dr. Jekyll and Mr. Hyde are characters in Robert Louis Stevenson's 1886 novella Strange Case of Dr Jekyll and Mr Hyde.

This page lists Wikipedia articles using "Dr. Jekyll and Mr. Hyde" or a very similar name, or links to the most closely related article for items using that name that do not have a Wikipedia article. For a fuller list of adaptations, including those using other names, see Adaptations of Strange Case of Dr. Jekyll and Mr. Hyde.

Dr. Jekyll and Mr. Hyde may also refer to:

Film
Dr. Jekyll and Mr. Hyde (1908 film), the first screen adaptation of Stevenson's novella
Dr. Jekyll and Mr. Hyde (1908). Directed by Sidney Olcott
 (US title: Dr. Jekyll and Mr. Hyde) (1910). Directed by August Blom
Dr. Jekyll and Mr. Hyde (1912 film), starring James Cruze
Dr. Jekyll and Mr. Hyde (1913 film), directed by Herbert Brenon and Carl Laemmle
Dr. Jekyll and Mr. Hyde (1913) British film produced by Charles Urban, in Kinemacolor
Dr. Jekyll and Mr. Hyde (1920 Haydon film), directed and written by J. Charles Haydon
Dr. Jekyll and Mr. Hyde (1920 Paramount film), featuring John Barrymore
Dr. Jekyll and Mr. Hyde (1931 film), starring Fredric March
Dr. Jekyll and Mr. Hyde (1941 film), featuring Spencer Tracy
Dr. Jekyll and Mr. Hyde (1986 film), an animated film produced by Burbank Films Australia
Dr Jekyll and Mr Hyde (2002 film), starring John Hannah
The Strange Case of Dr. Jekyll and Mr. Hyde (2006 film), a film starring Tony Todd

Television
"Dr. Jekyll and Mr. Hyde", season 1 episode 34 of Climax!, aired July 28, 1955
The Strange Case of Dr. Jekyll and Mr. Hyde (1968 film) 1968 television film starring Jack Palance
Jekyll and Hyde (TV series), 2015 British television series written by Charlie Higson
Dr. Jekyll and Mr. Hyde, characters in the television series Once Upon A Time

Stage
Dr. Jekyll and Mr. Hyde (1887 play), an 1887 stage adaptation by Thomas Russell Sullivan
Dr. Jekyll and Mr. Hyde (1888 play), an 1888 stage adaptation by John McKinney
Jekyll & Hyde (musical), a 1997 Broadway musical based on the story

Music
 Jekyll and Hyde (Petra album), a 2003 album from Christian rock band Petra
 Jekyll & Hyde en Español, the 2004 Spanish version of the album
 Jekyll and Hyde (Prime Circle album), a 2010 album from South African rock band Prime Circle
 Dr. Jeckyll & Mr. Hyde (group), a 1980s hip hop group consisting of Andre "Dr Jeckyll" Harrell and Alonzo "Mr Hyde" Brown
 Jeckyll & Hyde (musicians), a Dutch duo
 Jekyll + Hyde, a 2015 album by the Zac Brown Band

Songs
 "Dr. Jekyll and Mr. Hyde" (song), by The Who, 1968
 "Dr Jekyll & Mr Hyde", a 1981 song by The Damned from their 1980 album The Black Album
 "Jekyll and Hyde" (song) a 2015 song by Five Finger Death Punch
 "Jekyll and Hyde", a song by Judas Priest on the 2001 album Demolition
 "Jekyll and Hyde", a song by Iced Earth on the 2001 album, Horror Show
 "Jekyll or Hyde", a song by James LaBrie on the 2010 album, Static Impulse

Video games
 Dr. Jekyll and Mr. Hyde (video game), a 1988 video game
 Jekyll and Hyde (video game), a 2001 video game

Other
 "Dr. Jekyll and Mr. Hyde", a 2000 installment of the National Public Radio series Radio Tales
 Jekyll & Hyde Club, a Manhattan theme restaurant
 Dr. Henry Jekyll / Edward Hyde, a character in The League of Extraordinary Gentlemen

See also
 Dr. Jekyll and Ms. Hyde, a 1995 film directed by David Price
 P. D. Q. Bach and Peter Schickele: The Jekyll and Hyde Tour, a 2007 live recording album
 Dr. Heckyll and Mr. Jive (disambiguation)